As minas de prata is a novel written by Brazilian writer José de Alencar. The first part was published in 1865, and in 1866, the second part.

References

Novels by José de Alencar
1865 Brazilian novels
Portuguese-language novels